John S. "Long John" Wilson (November 2, 1915 – August 24, 2002) was an American football player.

Wilson, born in Dover, Ohio, played high school football for the Steubenville Big Red where we earned All-Ohio status.  He then played his college football for the Western Reserve Red Cats, present-day Case Western Reserve University, from 1935 – 1938 where he greatly contributed to a number of undefeated teams under Coach Bill Edwards.  His combined  collegiate record was 36-2-1.

Wilson played four seasons in the National Football League (NFL) for the Cleveland Rams from 1939 – 1942.

References

1915 births
2002 deaths
Case Western Spartans football players
Cleveland Rams players
People from Dover, Ohio
Sportspeople from Steubenville, Ohio
Players of American football from Ohio